The Plague That Makes Your Booty Move... It's the Infectious Grooves is the debut album by Infectious Grooves, released in 1991. The song "Therapy" featured vocals from Ozzy Osbourne. The album introduces the character Sarsippius.

Reception
Some of the songs received airplay on MTV, including "Therapy" and "Punk It Up". Steve Huey from AllMusic praised the album, calling it "an unabashed good-time party record". The album charted at 198 on the Billboard 200 and 6 on the Billboard Heatseekers.

Track listing 
 "Punk It Up" (Muir/Trujillo) – 3:51
 "Therapy" (Muir/Trujillo) – 3:25
 "I Look Funny?" (Muir/Sarsippius) – 0:26
 "Stop Funk'n with My Head" (Dunn/Muir/Trujillo) – 3:23
 "I'm Gonna Be My King" (Dunn/Muir/Trujillo) – 5:23
 "Closed Session" (Muir/Sarsippius) – 1:19
 "Infectious Grooves" (Dunn/Muir/Trujillo) – 4:13
 "Infectious Blues" (Muir/Trujillo) – 0:43
 "Monster Skank" (Muir/Trujillo) – 3:42
 "Back to the People" (Infectious Grooves) – 2:46
 "Turn Your Head" (Muir/Sarsippius) – 1:19
 "You Lie...And Yo Breath Stank" (Muir/Trujillo) – 2:55
 "Do the Sinister" (Muir/Trujillo) – 4:15
 "Mandatory Love Song" (Muir) – 0:09
 "Infecto Groovalistic" (Muir/Trujillo) – 5:05
 "Thanx But No Thanx" (Muir/Sarsippius) – 1:54

Credits 
 Greg Calbi – mastering
 Scott Crago – percussion, conga, drums
 Mark Dodson – producer, mixing
 Dave Dunn – keyboards
 Rocky George – guitar
 Phil Kettner – guitar
 Kenny Komisar – executive producer
 Dave Kushner – guitar
 Mike Muir – vocals, producer
 Ozzy Osbourne – vocals on "Therapy"
 Stephen Perkins – percussion, drums, timbales
 Dean Pleasants – guitar
 Adam Siegel – guitar, artwork
 Robert Trujillo – bass, producer
 Joel Zimmerman – art direction

Charts

References

1991 debut albums
Albums produced by Mark Dodson
Epic Records albums
Funk metal albums
Infectious Grooves albums